Suhana is a given name and a surname. Notable people with the name include:

 Sos Suhana (born 1992), Cambodian footballer
 Suhana Meharchand (born 1962), Canadian television journalist
 Suhana Thapa (born 1997), Nepali actress